In 2023 NASCAR will sanction three national series:
2023 NASCAR Cup Series – the top racing series in NASCAR
2023 NASCAR Xfinity Series – the second-highest racing series in NASCAR
2023 NASCAR Craftsman Truck Series – the third-highest racing series in NASCAR

 
NASCAR seasons